The W64 is a 6.4L V8 piston engine from Nissan. It was originally developed by the Prince Motor Company for use in the Prince Royal limousine, a limousine made for the Imperial Household of Japan.

History
Limited production, only 8 known units built.

Specifications
Aspiration: Naturally aspirated
Valvetrain: OHV
Displacement: 
Power:

See also
 List of Nissan engines
 Nissan Prince Royal
 Nissan Y engine
 Nissan 
 Prince Motor Company

W64
V8 engines
Gasoline engines by model